Warmer is the debut album by American singer-songwriter Randy VanWarmer.

Release
After moving back to the United States from Cornwall, England in 1978 and settling in Woodstock, New York, twenty-three-year-old VanWarmer signed to local label Bearsville Records. A year later Warmer was released and produced by Del Newman. It was initially released on vinyl, 8-track, and cassette, and in 1995 it was released on compact disc. "Just When I Needed You Most" was written by VanWarmer when he was eighteen and still in England, and the song has been described as "a ballad of heartbreak from a man's point of view." It reached No. 4 on Billboard in 1979.

Promotion
By December 1980, VanWarmer toured in Europe to support the release of Warmer, as well as Japan and Hong Kong.

Reception

A brief review in a 1979 issue of Billboard compares VanWarmer's style of singing on Warmer to that of The Bee Gees, and although the writer felt the album lacked diversity, "Just When I Needed You Most" was regarded as a good cut. According to  The Guinness Encyclopedia of Popular Music, "Just When I Needed You Most" was the song VanWarmer was "best remembered for."

Track listing
All tracks composed by Randy VanWarmer

Personnel
Randy VanWarmer - vocals, guitar, backing vocals
Arti Funaro, John Holbrook, John Tropea, Johnny Christopher, Mick Barakan, Steve Gibson - guitar
Jack Williams, Tony Levin - bass
John Holbrook, Mick Hodgkinson, Shane Keister, Warren Bernhardt - keyboards
Kenny Malone, Steve Jordan - drums
George Carnell, Ian Kimmet, John Holbrook, Ray Cooper - percussion
John Sebastian - autoharp
Stan Saltzman - saxophone
Alan Williams, Chris Thompson, Gary Osborne, John Richardson, Katie Kissoon, Roger Moss, Stevie Lange - backing vocals
Del Newman - string arrangements, conductor
Technical
John Holbrook - additional production, engineer, remixing
Ian Kimmet - additional production
Brent Maher, George Carnell, Jeff Hendrickson, Richard Dodd, Scott Litt - engineer
Desmond Strobel - art direction
Aaron Rapoport - photography

Charts

References

Citations

Sources

Online sources

External links

1979 debut albums
Bearsville Records albums
Randy VanWarmer albums
Albums produced by Del Newman